Franklin Township is one of thirteen townships in Grant County, Indiana, United States. As of the 2010 census, its population was 7,211 and it contained 3,553 housing units.

Geography
Lakes in this township include Crane Pond. The stream of Bell Creek runs through this township.

Cities and towns
 Marion (west quarter)
 Sweetser (southeast quarter)

Unincorporated towns
 Herbst
 Kiley
 Michaelsville
 Roseburg
 Westwood Square
(This list is based on USGS data and may include former settlements.)

Adjacent townships
 Pleasant Township (north)
 Center Township (east)
 Mill Township (east)
 Liberty Township (south)
 Green Township (southwest)
 Sims Township (west)
 Richland Township (northwest)

Cemeteries
The township contains two cemeteries: Grant Memorial Park and Rowland.

Major highways

Airports and landing strips
 Marion Municipal Airport

References
 
 United States Census Bureau cartographic boundary files

External links
 Indiana Township Association
 United Township Association of Indiana

Townships in Grant County, Indiana
Townships in Indiana